The Silence of Mercy is an upcoming American independent drama film directed by Floria Sigismondi and written by Chris Basler.

Cast
 Agnes Born as Roslyn
 Raffey Cassidy as Arild
 Alexandra Dowling 
 Annabelle Wallis

Production
In January 2019, Chris Basler's screenplay The Enclosed was one of ten included on the first GLAAD List, a joint venture between GLAAD and The Black List showcasing "the most promising unmade LGBTQ-inclusive scripts in Hollywood". On December 11, 2020, it was announced that Floria Sigismondi would direct the film, now titled The Silence of Mercy, with Annabelle Wallis starring. In March 2021, Agnes Born joined the cast of the film.

Principal photography took place from February 25 to April 15, 2021, in Ireland.

References

External links
 

Upcoming films
American drama films
American independent films
American LGBT-related films
Films directed by Floria Sigismondi
Films shot in Ireland
LGBT-related drama films
Upcoming English-language films